Antonios Grigorios Voutsinos (8 May 1891 – 23 April 1968) was born in Galissas, Syros of Greece. He was ordained a priest of the Assumptionists in 1918, appointed bishop of Syros and Milos, Greece in 1937, Archbishop of Corfu, Zante and Cefalonia in 1947 and Archbishop of Aprus in 1952. He died as archbishop emeritus in 1968.

Notes

1891 births
1968 deaths
People from Ano Syros
20th-century Roman Catholic archbishops in Turkey
Participants in the Second Vatican Council
20th-century Roman Catholic archbishops in Greece
Roman Catholic archbishops of Corfu
Greek expatriate bishops